Dagmar Oja (born 8 July 1981) is an Estonian singer.

Life 
Oja was born in Avinurme, Jõgeva County. She graduated from the Georg Ots Music School of Tallinn, and become known as a backing singer for different pop acts of Estonia, such as Anne Veski, Maarja-Liis Ilus, Eda-Ines Etti and Ithaka Maria.

Dagmar Oja has repeatedly performed at the Eurovision Song Contest as a backing singer. In 2002 she provided backing vocals for Ira Losco who represented Malta that year, and in 2006 she did the same for Sandra Oxenryd who sang "Through My Window" for Estonia. In 2016, she provided vocal support for Jüri Pootsmann, the Estonian representative at the Eurovision Song Contest held in Stockholm, and in the 2017 contest for Koit Toome and Laura Põldvere and in 2019 for Victor Crone. She is also involved with Estonia's 2020 entry, "What Love Is".

She has been cast in stage musicals like "Billy Elliot" and "Anything Goes" as a choirist.

References

External links 
 Taustalauljate esinumber – Dagmar Oja (www.kalev.ee) 

1981 births
Living people
People from Mustvee Parish
Eurovision Song Contest entrants for Estonia
21st-century Estonian women singers
Estonian pop singers
Estonian musical theatre actresses
Estonian stage actresses